Linda Ann Fredericks (born 27 September 1950), better known as Linda Lewis, is an English vocalist, songwriter and guitarist. She is the eldest of six children, three of whom also had singing careers. She is best known for the singles "Rock-a-Doodle-Doo" (1973), "Sideway Shuffle" (1973) and her version of Betty Everett's "Shoop Shoop Song (It's in His Kiss)" (1975), and for solo albums including Lark (1972), Not a Little Girl Anymore (1975), Woman Overboard (1977) and the later Second Nature (1995), which became successful in countries such as Japan. Lewis also provided backing vocals for other artists, including David Bowie, Al Kooper, Cat Stevens, Steve Harley and Cockney Rebel, Rick Wakeman, Rod Stewart, Peter Bardens, Hummingbird, Joan Armatrading and Jamiroquai.

Lewis is a self-taught guitarist and keyboard player, influenced by Harry Nilsson, Billie Holiday and Smokey Robinson, also drawing inspiration from others such as Joni Mitchell. Her music blends folk, funk and soul.

Biography

1960s
Linda Fredericks was born in West Ham, Essex. At the age of three she was sent to stage school and was regularly cast in non-speaking television and film roles such as A Taste of Honey (1961) and as a screaming fan in the first Beatles film A Hard Day's Night (1964); she also sang to the public for money. She joined The Q Set, a British band who performed ska and blue beat, Jamaican-style music.

In 1964, she sang "Dancing in the Streets" with John Lee Hooker at a club in Southend-on-Sea. Hooker introduced her to Ian Samwell, who arranged for Don Arden to manage her. She signed with Polydor and recorded the single "You Turned My Bitter into Sweet", which is now a collectable Northern Soul record. Polydor worried that her name, Linda Fredericks, would be confused with Linda Kendrick, who was also signed to Polydor. Fredericks used the name Linda Lewis in honour of singer Barbara Lewis. The surname would also be used professionally by her sisters, Dee Lewis and Shirley Lewis, and her mother.

1970s
During 1967, Linda Lewis formed White Rabbit with Junior Marvin, moving on to replace Marsha Hunt in the soul rock band The Ferris Wheel in 1970 and touring Europe with them. She also recorded the album Ferris Wheel (1970) and the single "Can't Stop Now" with them before the band broke up the same year. On 19 September 1970, Lewis appeared at the first Glastonbury Festival (where she jammed with Terry Reid and David Lindley), having been booked by the DJ and concert booker Jeff Dexter. After a chance meeting with Warner Bros. Records executive Ian Ralfini, Lewis signed to Warner Bros. Records imprint label Reprise. Lewis also worked as a session vocalist in this period, which led to her appearance on albums such as Possible Projection of the Future by Al Kooper, David Bowie's Aladdin Sane (1973), Cat Stevens's Catch Bull at Four (1972) and Hummingbird's first album Hummingbird (1975). She then signed to Family's new Warner Brothers distributed "Raft" label.

Her first hit single "Rock-a-Doodle-Doo" reached No. 15 in the UK Singles Chart in the summer of 1973, and it was followed by the album Fathoms Deep, which featured former Jeff Beck group guitarist Bobby Tench. This album established her as one of Britain's most promising young female singer-songwriters and was critically acclaimed, but it did not have the expected success, probably due to Raft Records becoming insolvent at that time. However, several appearances on the BBC TV show Top of the Pops raised her profile, and an extensive world tour with Cat Stevens followed. On her return to the studio, she signed to Arista Records and recorded what would become her breakthrough album Not a Little Girl Anymore (1975), which featured Allen Toussaint and the Tower of Power horn section. A cover of "The Shoop Shoop Song" was released as a single, under the title of "It's in his Kiss", at the same time as Not a Little Girl Anymore, reaching No. 6 in the UK Singles Chart. The singles "The Old Schoolyard" which Cat Stevens wrote for her, and "It’s In His Kiss" were produced by the team of Tony Sylvester and Bert de Coteaux.  On 5 July 1975, Lewis opened the Knebworth Festival, being followed by Roy Harper, Captain Beefheart and the Magic Band, the Steve Miller Band and Pink Floyd. She sings on the Go Too album, released in 1977, with Jess Roden. Three more albums followed over the next few years. In 1986 and 1987, she recorded with her sisters Dee and Shirley as Lewis, then as Lewis Sisters.

1980s–present
During the next decade, Lewis retreated from public life and moved to Los Angeles, although in 1984, she again appeared at the Glastonbury Festival, as well as recording for Electricity Records. In 1992, she worked on the Joan Armatrading album Square the Circle as a backing vocalist, along with her sister Shirley and Sylvia Mason-James. She then returned to record Second Nature (1995), which found success in the Japanese charts. Its success led to live performances, which were recorded and released as On the Stage – Live in Japan (1996). Three more albums followed. Warner Bros. Records released Reach for the Truth: The Best of the Reprise Years (2002), an anthology of her work during the previous thirty years. This was followed by BMG releasing The Best of Linda Lewis (2003), which included her hit singles. During 2003 she also appeared at the Glastonbury Festival, and was filmed by BBC Television whilst she appeared on the Jazz and World Stage.

Her song "Old Smokey" was used by the rapper Common, on his single "Go!" (2005), which appeared on his album Be (2005). This was produced by Kanye West and reached No. 1 on the United States R&B and Hip Hop charts. She recorded Live in Old Smokey (2006), which featured new and previously released songs and toured the United Kingdom the same year. On 28 October 2006, The National Portrait Gallery opened an exhibit entitled Photographs 1965–2006, this featured a portrait by Lewis's former husband Jim Cregan and other sitters, such as Shirley Bassey. In 2007, she toured with the Soul Britannia All Stars in the United Kingdom, and on 3 February 2007, BBC Four featured performances by Lewis, in a sixty-minute recording of a Barbican show with the Soul Britannia All Stars. In June of the same year, she collaborated with Basement Jaxx on "Close Your Eyes", which featured in the Japanese anime film Vexille.

Critical reception
Lewis has a five-octave vocal range. Charles Waring of Blues & Soul magazine described her vocal range, as heard on The Best of Linda Lewis (2003), as "powerful". In her review of Lewis's album Second Nature (1995) for Allmusic, Amy Hanson described Lewis's voice as "remarkable and dynamic". Of Lewis's ability to sing in the whistle register, Hanson comments in her review of Lark (1972), "No longer a wild weapon that can soar from childlike lilt to screaming dog whistle without a moment's notice, she channels her range to the emotions it demands." Lewis's voice has also been compared to that of Mariah Carey. Reviewer Melissa Weber commented that her voice had similarities to that of Minnie Riperton, and that Lewis had "a wider vocal range [than Riperton], with the ability to sing in a lower register."

Discography

Studio albums

Live albums
 Born Performer: Live in Japan (Sony, 1996)
 Live in Old Smokey (Market Place, 2006)
 Hampstead Days (The BBC Recordings) (Troubadour, 2014)

Collaboration
 Have You Noticed? Ludmilla featuring Linda Lewis (Reprise, 1993)

Compilations
 Heart Strings (Reprise, 1974)
 The Best of Linda Lewis (compilation) (BMG, 1996)
 Best of Linda Lewis (Camden, 1997)
 Reach for the Truth: Best of the Reprise Years 1971–74 (Rhino, 2002)
 Legends (compilation) (BMG, 2005)
 Hampstead Days (previously unreleased 1970s sessions and concert material) 2014

Singles

Notes

References

Additional sources

External links
Official Linda Lewis website
Linda Lewis Myspace

1950 births
Living people
20th-century Black British women singers
English session musicians
English rock guitarists
English pop guitarists
English women singer-songwriters
English women guitarists
People from West Ham
Singers from London
Singers from Essex
20th-century British guitarists
21st-century British guitarists
21st-century Black British women singers
Streetwalkers members
20th-century women guitarists
21st-century women guitarists